A bandy (or bandi) is a carriage or cart used in India and Sri Lanka, especially one drawn by bullocks. A driver of a bandy is a bandyman. It is derived from the Tamil/Malayalam word vandy meaning cart.

In May 1809  brought into Madras her prize, Caravan, which was carrying "...carriages and bandis."

Citations and references
Citations

References

External links
Bandy to the Shandy : Blogocentricity

Carriages
Carts
Road transport in Sri Lanka
Transport in Ceylon